Michèl Yost (Paris, 1754 – Paris, July 5, 1786) was a famous French clarinetist and cofounder of the French clarinet school. He was a brilliant instrumentalist and even known beyond the boundaries of France.

Yost was a friend of Johann Christoph Vogel. Joseph Beer (1744–1811) was Yost's teacher. Yost himself was a clarinet teacher counting famous clarinetists such as Xavier Lefèvre amongst his pupils.

Compositions
Although most compositions were published under his own name, some are the result of a cooperation with other musicians such as Johann Christoph Vogel. Some of his concertos have been recorded by Dieter Klöcker.

 Concerto no. 1
 Concerto no. 2 in B flat
 Concerto no. 3 in B flat
 Concerto no. 4 
 Concerto no. 5 in E flat
 Concerto no. 6
 Concerto no. 7 in B-flat major for Clarinet and Orchestra ("de Michel et Vogel")
 Concerto no. 8 in E-flat major for Clarinet and Orchestra ("de Michel et Vogel")
 Concerto no. 9 in B-flat major for Clarinet and Orchestra ("de Michel et Vogel")
 Concerto no. 10 in B flat ("de Michel et Vogel")
 Concerto no. 11 in B-flat major for Clarinet and Orchestra ("de Michel et Vogel")
 Concerto no. 12 in B flat ("de Michel et Vogel")
 Concerto no. 13 ("de Michel et Vogel")
 Concerto no. 14 in E flat ("de Michel et Vogel")
 Duo Concertante for 2 clarinets
 12 Grand Solos or Studies
 Airs variés
 Duos op. 1, 2, 3, 4, 7
 6 Duos op. 5
 6 Duos op. 6
 6 Duos op. 8 for clarinet & violin
 6 Duos op. 9 for clarinet & violin
 6 Duos op. 10
 6 Favorite duets op. 12
 3 Trios for flute, clarinet & bassoon
 3 Trios for 2 clarinets & cello
 3 Trios for clarinet, violin & cello
 Airs variés for clarinet, viola & cello
 5 Quartets, with Vogel
 6 Quartets, with Vogel, opp. 1, 2, 3, 4, & 5

Discography
Dieter Klöcker, Michèl Yost, Concertos for Clarinet and Orchestra, MDGL MDG 301 0718-2, © 1997, (p) 1997

References

External links
 
 
 Michel Yost bei Klassika
 

1754 births
1786 deaths
Musicians from Paris
French classical clarinetists
18th-century French composers
18th-century French male musicians
French male composers